Cynoglossum troodi, Troodos hound's tongue is an erect, perennial herb, 10–25 cm high, with branched stems covered with stiff hairs. Leaves alternate, simple, entire, stalkless, oblong to lanceolate, densely hairy, the basal in tufts, 2-5 x 0.5–1 cm, the upper sparse and smaller. Flowers actinomorphic  in cymose inflorescences, very small, corolla brick-red, tubular, 5-lobed. Flowers May–August. Fruit of 4 nutlets with rigid spinules.

Habitat 
In Pinus nigra ssp. pallasiana and Juniperus foetidissima forests on serpentine in Troödos forest at 1500–1950 m altitude.

Distribution
Endemic to Cyprus, common on the higher parts of the Troödos forest, Khionistra, Prodromos, Chromion, Troödos square and Kryos Potamos.

References

External links
 http://www.troodos-geo.org/upload/20130925/1380118849-21950.jpg
 http://www.ncu.org.cy/troodos/lang1/gallery/Cynoglossum-troodi-web.jpg
 http://www.natureofcyprus.org/uploadimages/Cynoglossumtroodi600450endem.jpg

troodi
Endemic flora of Cyprus